A Maid of Constant Sorrow is the debut album by American singer and songwriter Judy Collins, released in 1961 on Elektra Records and featuring traditional folk songs.

Content and style
On the album Collins' voice and guitar are sparsely accompanied by Fred Hellerman on second guitar and Erik Darling on banjo. The title song is a variant of "Man of Constant Sorrow". The selections range from the Scottish anthem "Wild Mountain Thyme" to the Irish standards "Bold Fenian Men" and "The Prickilie Bush". The album also includes more obscure numbers, such as "Tim Evans", "Wars of Germany" and "John Riley".

These songs are in the style of social protest, similar to early recordings by Bob Dylan. They reveal a style from Collins different than her later, better-known releases. In "Tim Evans", written by Ewan MacColl (Grammy award-winning writer in 1972 of "The First Time Ever I Saw Your Face"), she sings of a man wrongfully convicted and hanged for the killing of a woman and child ("Go down, you murderer, go down"), whose exoneration comes only after having been hanged. Her alto vocals on lively songs like "O Daddy Be Gay" contrast with the social message material. 

In 2001, Elektra re-released the album on CD with Collins' second album, Golden Apples of the Sun (1962).

Track listing
All songs traditional, arranged by Judy Collins, except where otherwise noted.

Side one
"Maid of Constant Sorrow" – 2:35
"The Prickilie Bush" – 3:25
"Wild Mountain Thyme" (Frank McPeake) – 2:30
"Tim Evans" (Ewan MacColl) – 2:51 
"Sailor's Life" – 2:41
"Bold Fenian Men" – 2:44

Side two
"Wars of Germany" – 3:10
"O Daddy Be Gay" – 2:34
"I Know Where I'm Going" (Herbert Hughes) – 1:50
"John Riley" – 3:30
"Pretty Saro" – 3:03
"The Rising of the Moon" – 4:07

Personnel
Judy Collins – guitar, vocals

Additional musicians
Fred Hellerman – second guitar
Erik Darling – banjo

Technical
Jac Holzman – production supervisor
Mark Abramson – editing
William S. Harvey – cover design
Lida Moser – cover photo

References

Judy Collins albums
1961 debut albums
Albums produced by Jac Holzman
Elektra Records albums